Events in the year 2006 in Cyprus.

Incumbents 

 President: Demetris Christofias
 President of the Parliament: Yiannakis Omirou

Events 
Ongoing – Cyprus dispute

 12 September – Cypriot authorities respond to an Interpol alert and intercept Grigorio-1, a North Korean ship bound for Syria. Cypriot security agents found a mobile air defense system and the components of a missile launcher in the ship, though the Government of North Korea insists the ship only contained weather-observation equipment. The Syrian government has requested the ship be allowed to dock in Syria.

Deaths

References 

 
2000s in Cyprus
Years of the 21st century in Cyprus
Cyprus
Cyprus
Cyprus